Phìn Hồ is a commune (xã) and village of the Nậm Pồ District of Điện Biên Province, northwestern Vietnam. The commune covers an area of 114.3 square kilometres and has a reported population of 2544 inhabitants in 2005.

References

Communes of Điện Biên province
Populated places in Điện Biên province